This is a list of flag bearers who have represented El Salvador at the Olympics.

Flag bearers carry the national flag of their country at the opening ceremony of the Olympic Games.

See also
El Salvador at the Olympics

References

El Salvador at the Olympics
El Salvador
Olympic flagbearers
Olympic flagbearers